The Turnu oil field is an oil field located in Pecica, Arad County. It was discovered in 1964 and developed by Petrom. It began production in 1965 and produces oil.

References

Oil fields in Romania